Andrew Kirkaldy may refer to:

 Andrew Kirkaldy (golfer) (1860–1934), Scottish professional golfer
 Andrew Kirkaldy (racing driver) (born 1976), Scottish racing driver and team principal